This page lists the winners and nominees for the Soul Train Music Award for Best R&B/Soul Single – Male. The award was given out every year since the first annual Soul Train Music Awards in 1987. From 1989 to 1992 the award was known as R&B/Urban Contemporary Single – Male. When the Soul Train Music Awards returned in 2009 the categories of Best R&B/Soul Single – Male and Best R&B/Soul Album – Male were consolidated into the Best R&B/Soul Male Artist category. Michael Jackson has won the most awards in this category, with a total of three wins.

Winners and nominees
Winners are listed first and highlighted in bold.

1980s

1990s

2000s

References

Soul Train Music Awards